BNP Paribas Corporate and Institutional Banking (CIB) is the global investment banking arm of BNP Paribas, the largest banking group in the world.  In October 2010, BNP Paribas was ranked by Bloomberg and Forbes as the largest bank and largest company in the world by assets with over US$3.1 trillion. BNP Paribas CIB's main centres are in Paris and London, with large scale operations in New York, Hong Kong, and Singapore, and smaller operations in almost every financial centre in the world.  It employs 185,000 people across 56 countries and provides financing, advisory and capital markets services. BNP Paribas CIB is a globally recognised leader in two areas of expertise: trading derivatives on all asset classes, and structured financing. BNP Paribas CIB also has a large corporate advisory network in Europe and Asia. BNP Paribas CIB has 13,000 clients, consisting of companies, financial institutions, governments, investment funds and hedge funds.

BNP Paribas CIB benefits from the Group's large asset base (over €2 trillion) and diverse business model, and is proving resilient in the economic and financial crisis that has been affecting the banking sector since 2007. Revenues from BNP Paribas CIB nearly doubled in the second quarter of 2009 as robust investor demand boosted revenues from the bank's fixed income trading business unit.  CIB's revenues totaled €3.351 billion (US$4.82 billion) for the quarter, up 81 percent from the second quarter of 2008, and following record revenues of €3.696 billion in the first quarter of 2009.

Notable current and former employees

Business
Nassim Taleb - Practitioner of financial mathematics, author of The Black Swan, Fooled by Randomness and Dynamic Hedging, and former BNP Paribas prop trader in New York.

Politics and public service
Louis Alphonse of Bourbon, Duke of Anjou - considered by royalists as the head of the French Royal House.
Jacques de Larosière - managing director of the International Monetary Fund (1978–87); Governor of the Banque de France (1987–93)
Lorenz of Habsburg, Archduke of Austria-Este

Other
David McWilliams - economist

See also 

List of French companies
List of banks
Primary dealers
European Financial Services Roundtable

References

External links
 

BNP Paribas
Investment banks
Primary dealers